China National Highway 214 (G214) runs from Xining, Qinghai to Jinghong, Yunnan. It is 3,256  kilometres in length and runs south from Xining towards Tibet, and ends in Yunnan Province.

Route and distance

See also
 China National Highways

External links
Official website of Ministry of Transport of PRC

214
Transport in Qinghai
Roads in Tibet
Transport in Yunnan